Tejendra Nirwal is an Indian politician. He belongs to the Bharatiya Janata Party. He is a member of Seventeenth Legislative Assembly of Uttar Pradesh representing the Shamli assembly constituency. Nirwal is 51 years old (2017) and a post-graduate.

Political career
Tejendra Nirwal has been a member of the 17th Legislative Assembly of Uttar Pradesh. Since 2017, he has represented the Shamli constituency and is a member of the Bhartiya Janata Party.

In 2017 elections he defeated Indian National Congress candidate Pankaj Kumar Malik, by a margin of 29,720 votes.

Posts held

References 

Living people
Bharatiya Janata Party politicians from Uttar Pradesh
Uttar Pradesh MLAs 2017–2022
People from Shamli district
Year of birth missing (living people)